Fair Play is an unincorporated community located in the town of Jamestown in Grant County, Wisconsin, United States.

Notable people
Wiley Scribner, politician and acting governor of Montana Territory

Notes

Unincorporated communities in Wisconsin
Unincorporated communities in Grant County, Wisconsin